The Riverina Intermodal Freight and Logistics Hub (also known as RiFL Hub) is an under construction Australian dry port in the northern Wagga Wagga suburb of Bomen adjacent to the Main Southern railway line.

History
In July 2013 the Wagga Wagga City Council resolved sought submissions from applicants for the operation of the proposed Riverina Intermodal Freight and Logistics Hub. Asciano were selected as the preferred proponent but backed out. A second venture with rail infrastructure specialist Traxion failed when that company went into voluntary administration.

In September 2015 Genesee & Wyoming Australia were selected as the preferred proponent, signing a framework agreement with the council in April 2017.

In 2016 BMD Constructions commenced enabling works. In 2018 it was announced that Visy Industries would invest in the development of a freight terminal with the Council In January 2021, construction commenced with work scheduled for completion in mid-2022.

References

Bomen, New South Wales
Dry ports
Proposed transport infrastructure in Australia
Transport in New South Wales

Wagga Wagga